Karina Elizabeth de Visser (Karin de Visser, 1975), also named "Karin E. de Visser", is a researcher at the Netherlands Cancer Institute. Her research considers metastatic formation and how the immune system influences how people respond to cancer treatment.

Early life and education 
In 1998 De Visser obtained her masters degree in Biomedical Science at Leiden University (cum laude).  
De Visser was a postgraduate student at the Netherlands Cancer Institute, supervised by prof. dr. Ada Kruisbeek. In 2002 she got her PhD degree at the Vrije Universiteit Amsterdam with her thesis The impact of self-antigen expression on the CD8+ T cell repertoire: Implications for anti-tumor immunity.

In 2003 she was appointed a postdoctoral fellow with Lisa Coussens at the University of California, San Francisco. Here she started working on the interaction between the adaptive and innate immune system. She spent two years in California, before returning to the Netherlands Cancer Institute where she started working on inflammation and carcinogenesis.

Research and career 
De Visser launched her independent career at the Netherlands Cancer Institute, where she started working on tumour biology and immunology. De Visser looks to understand how the immune system impacts the formation of metastasis and response to cancer treatment. In particular, De Visser has focussed on breast cancer, and how tumours can hijack the immune system to allow for metastatic spread. She also identified that the precise genetic make-up of breast cancer determines pro-metastatic inflammation.

She works closely with Marleen Kok on translation of her findings to clinical environments, including looking to understand the landscape of breast cancer patients treated with checkpoint inhibitors.

Awards and honours 

 2014 European Research Council Consolidator Grant
 2015 Beug Foundation Metastasis Research Prize
 2016 Elected to the European Molecular Biology Organization
 2019 Awarded a NWO-VICI grant
 2021 Elected member of the European Molecular Biology Organization

Select publications

References 

Living people
Year of birth missing (living people)
Cancer researchers
Dutch women scientists